Giovanni de' Medici may refer to:

Giovanni di Bicci de' Medici (1360–1429), founder of the Medici dynasty
Giovanni di Cosimo de' Medici (1421–1463), second son of Cosimo the Elder
Pope Leo X (Giovanni di Lorenzo de' Medici, 1475–1521)
Giovanni de' Medici il Popolano, (1467–1498) husband of Caterina Sforza, Lady of Imola and Forlì
Giovanni dalle Bande Nere (1498–1526), son of Caterina Sforza, Lady of Imola and Forlì
Giovanni de' Medici (cardinal) (1544–1562), second son of Cosimo I
Don Giovanni de' Medici (1567–1621), illegitimate son of Cosimo I